The Stanford Super Series was a series of Twenty20 cricket matches in 2008, sponsored by Allen Stanford. The main game of the Series matched the English national cricket team against an all-star team from the Caribbean, called the Stanford Superstars.

The prize money awarded in the tournament was winner-take-all; the players for the winning team in the yearly game took home $20 million prize money, and the losing players did not earn anything. The domestic West Indies and England Twenty20 champions competed for the Champions Cup, as well as playing in a series of other exhibition matches with the Superstars and England. The tournament collapsed following the arrest (and subsequent conviction) of Allen Stanford for an $8 billion fraud, part of which funded the prize money for the Super Series.

History
Allen Stanford proposed emphasizing Twenty20 cricket as a way to promote cricket in the West Indies. He created the Stanford 20/20, a yearly tournament featuring teams from the island nations that made up the West Indies. From the first edition of his tournament in 2006, he aimed to have the best players from his tournament play as a team against an international team. Initially, South Africa had been planned to play against the Stanford team for a prize of US$5 million, but that effort fell through after scheduling conflicts with the WICB.

In 2008, Stanford looked to expand the tournament and decided once again to feature a high-stakes game featuring the best players in the West Indies versus an international team. Stanford initially wished to invite Sri Lanka, India, Australia and South Africa to come and play a single-elimination tournament in Antigua, with the winner facing his all-star team. However, due to contractual issues with the ICC and ESPN-Star and scheduling constraints that tournament was infeasible. Instead, Stanford invited the winners of the World Twenty20, India, to play for a prize of US$5 million (later US$10 million) and planned to ask Australia to come as a back-up should India decline or be unavailable. India, who were in the process of launching the highly successful first year of their domestic Twenty20 league, the Indian Premier League, declined as they did not want to be involved in a privately funded programme.

When that deal fell through, Stanford increased the prize money to US$20 million and aimed to get either England or Australia involved. After meeting with the ECB from April through June, Stanford finally signed a five-year deal with the England and Wales Cricket Board to host a series of US$20 million, winner-take-all matches, worth $100 million in total. In addition, the deal included an annual Twenty20 quadrangular involving England (as hosts), West Indies and two invitational teams with a prize of US$9.5 million.

Prize money
The final $20 million prize was split as follows: each of the 11 players on the winning team who played in the championship game would take home $1 million. Another $1 million would be split amongst the players who were selected for the winning team, but did not play in the championship game; $1 million would go to the management team and the remaining $7 million would be split between the English Cricket Board and the West Indies Cricket Board.

Competitors 
The Stanford Superstars and an England XI were scheduled to compete in the first five tournaments. Alongside them were the champions of the Stanford 20/20 in the West Indies and the champions of the Twenty20 Cup in England. These were Trinidad and Tobago and Middlesex Crusaders. The two domestic champions competed for the Champions Cup whilst Stanford Superstars and England contested the Final, labelled the 20/20 For 20 match.

Reception 
The matches were well attended, but the press (especially the British contingent) was mainly very sceptical. "Of all the short-form matches currently being organised," wrote Stephen Brenkley in The Independent on 26 October 2008, "the conclusion is easily reached that Stanford Superstars v England is the most offensive. It has no context as a proper sporting competition, it is neither country versus country, club versus club or invitation XI versus invitation XI. It is a rococo hybrid. It has money, but nothing else going for it." It has since been alleged that Stanford's creation of the tournament was primarily a method to launder his income from the fraudulent business schemes for which he is now serving a penal sentence in the US.

Dissolution
Following the first year of the series, the future of the competition was put in doubt after Stanford disbanded his team of 12 'Stanford Legends' who had been acting as ambassadors for the tournament. In the wake of fraud charges made against Stanford, the ECB terminated all contracts with Stanford in February 2009, meaning that the England cricket team took no further part in Stanford organised matches. Stanford was later convicted of 13 of 14 charges laid against him by U.S. authorities and was sentenced to 110 years in prison, which he is currently serving in United States Penitentiary, Coleman in Coleman, Florida

2008 Results

Trans-Atlantic Twenty20 Champions Cup

Final

See also
 Stanford 20/20

References

External links
 Official site archived via the Wayback Machine

Twenty20 cricket leagues
West Indian domestic cricket competitions
2008 in cricket
Cricket in Antigua and Barbuda
Stanford Financial Group
Stanford 20/20